Jefferson Francisco Marques Lopes; born 17 October 1989 in São Paulo), commonly known as Jefferson, is a Brazilian footballer who played as a defensive midfielder for SC Gjilani in the Football Superleague of Kosovo.

References

1989 births
Living people
Footballers from São Paulo
Association football midfielders
Brazilian footballers
Associação Portuguesa de Desportos players
Ferroviário Atlético Clube (CE) players
Associação Atlética Portuguesa (Santos) players
FK Kukësi players
SC Gjilani players
Kategoria Superiore players
Football Superleague of Kosovo players
Brazilian expatriate footballers
Expatriate footballers in Albania
Brazilian expatriate sportspeople in Albania
Expatriate footballers in Kosovo
Brazilian expatriate sportspeople in Kosovo